Kanel Department is one of the 45 departments of Senegal, located in the Matam Region in the east of the country.

The department has six communes; Kanel, Semmé, Waounde, Dembakané, Hamady Ounaré and Sinthiou Bamambé-Banadji

The rural districts (Communautés rurales) comprise:
Arrondissement of Orkadiere:
 Aouré
 Bokiladji
 Orkadiere
Arrondissement of Wouro Sidy:
 Wouro Sidy
 Ndendory

Historic sites
 Mausoleum of Cheikh Moussa Kamara at Ganguel
 The mosque of Kobilo
 The mosque of Séno Palel
 Mausoleum of Abdel Kader Kane

References

Departments of Senegal
Matam Region